Marie-Louise Bouglé (January 5, 1883 – June 13, 1936) was a French feminist, librarian, and archivist who founded a feminist library. The major themes of Archives Marie-Louise Bouglé are suffragism and pacifism. The collection is held by Bibliothèque historique de la ville de Paris.

Early life
Marie-Louise Françoise Bouglé was born in Argouges on January 5, 1883. She was the youngest of a family of eleven children. Her father was a brickmaker.

Bouglé left school at the age of ten. Orphaned at the age of 11, she joined her sister in Paris. During the day, Bouglé worked as a saleswoman. In the evening, she learned shorthand, accounting, English, Spanish, and German. She also attended lectures at popular universities. She became a secretary-accountant and cashier in a restaurant in exchange for free meals.

Career
In 1910, Bouglé attended a conference facilitated by Cécile Brunschvicg. Bougle discovered feminist movements and joined the French Union for Women's Suffrage (UFSF). After World War I, she became aware of the importance of documenting, centralizing and collecting documents on feminist and pacifist movements. In 1921, Bouglé began to build a library at home. In 1923, the library consisted of 12,000 documents, and was opened to the public two evenings a week. She found the descendants of 19th century feminists. She contacts the heirs of Léon Richer and Caroline Kauffmann, obtaining bequests. She collected the personal correspondence and photos of her friends and colleagues, the manuscripts of their notes for unfinished biographies of famous women as well as their studies of women's working conditions. The reputation of the library grew. It made exchanges with other foreign feminist libraries.

After her marriage in 1933, Bouglé devoted herself entirely to her work as a librarian and archivist of feminist documents. She moved from her small room in the 10th arrondissement of Paris to settle herself and her library in the 13th arrondissement. Of her motive, Bouglé said:— 

Bouglé rejected in principle the idea that her collection might be absorbed by that of Marguerite Durand because of ideological differences between the two women. The honorary presidency was bestowed on Cécile Brunschvicg.

Archives Marie-Louise Bouglé
Bouglé's relatives tried to find a place to deposit the collection, but no library wanted it on the pretext that it was devoid of historical interest. In 1942, Mariani decided to bequeath the collection to the Bibliothèque nationale de France. In 1946, the collection was inherited by the Bibliothèque historique de la ville de Paris. Known as "Fonds Bouglé" in its early years, it was later renamed as "Archives Marie-Louise Bouglé".

In the present day, Bouglé's 6,686 works can be consulted at the library, and the archives of feminist personalities collected by Bouglé are gradually being described on the portal of the Bibliothèque historique de la ville de Paris. Two major themes characterize the Archives Marie-Louise Bouglé, suffragism and pacifism. The collection is also notable for the large number of images (photographs, posters, postcards) inserted in the files. These fonds and the Bibliothèque Marguerite Durand preserve essential archives of the history of the first wave of feminism in France.

Death
Marie-Louise Bouglé died in Paris on June 13, 1936.

References

Further reading
 

1883 births
1936 deaths
French feminists
Organization founders
Women founders
People from Manche